The ninth and final season of Last Man Standing premiered on January 3, 2021 on Fox, and contained twenty-one episodes. It stars Tim Allen as Mike Baxter, alongside Nancy Travis, Amanda Fuller, Molly McCook, Christoph Sanders, Jordan Masterson, Jonathan Adams, Krista Marie Yu, and Héctor Elizondo. After the season premiere on Sunday, January 3, the show moved to its regular timeslot at 9:30 PM on Thursdays. The series concluded on May 20, 2021 with a one-hour series finale.

Cast

Main cast
 Tim Allen as Mike Baxter and Tim Taylor
 Nancy Travis as Vanessa Baxter
 Amanda Fuller as Kristin Beth Baxter
 Molly McCook as Amanda Elaine "Mandy" Baxter-Anderson
 Christoph Sanders as Kyle Anderson
 Jordan Masterson as Ryan Vogelson
 Jonathan Adams as Chuck Larabee
 Krista Marie Yu as Jen
 Héctor Elizondo as Edward "Ed" Alzate

Recurring
 Jay Leno as Joe Leonard

Guest
 Kaitlyn Dever as Eve Baxter
 François Chau as Henry
 Bill Engvall as Reverend Paul
 Jeff Dunham as himself

Episodes

Production

Development
On May 19, 2020, Fox renewed Last Man Standing for a ninth season. On October 14, 2020, it was announced that the season would be the final one of the series. The season takes place in 2023, so that it doesn't have to be during the COVID-19 pandemic, although it will still address how the pandemic impacted the characters. The time jump also allows the babies that the Kristin and Mandy characters were pregnant with at the close of season 8 to be presented as three-year old toddlers. The premiere was originally planned to be the unfinished finale from the eighth season, however due to the fact that most of it would have to be rewritten, and that planned guest-star Kaitlyn Dever was unavailable, the producers instead decided to write a new episode.

Casting
On December 4, 2020, it was announced that series star Tim Allen would also reprise his role from Home Improvement as Tim "The Tool Man" Taylor for the second episode of the season, "Dual Time". Even though the producers had some difficulty getting permission to use the character of Tim Taylor, they ultimately were able to obtain it. On December 25, 2020, it was announced that Sophia McKinlay would portray Sarah. Krista Marie Yu is set to reprise her role as Jen starting with the fourth episode of the season, "Jen Again". Kaitlyn Dever reprised her role as Eve Baxter in the season premiere, "Time Flies".

Release
On November 10, 2020, it was announced that the season would have a special premiere on January 3, 2021, before moving to its regular timeslot on January 7, 2021. On December 22, 2020, it was announced that the season would premiere an hour later than originally planned on January 3, 2021, to make room for the series premiere of The Great North.

Ratings

References

2021 American television seasons
Last Man Standing (American TV series)